Donald Wayne Beatty (born April 29, 1952) is the chief justice of the South Carolina Supreme Court and formerly a Court of Appeals judge for the state. He was elected to a seat on the South Carolina Supreme Court on May 23, 2007, to replace Justice E. C. Burnett, III. He became Chief Justice on February 1, 2017.

References

Justices of the South Carolina Supreme Court
University of South Carolina School of Law alumni
Living people
1952 births
People from Spartanburg, South Carolina